Jean-Pierre Cordebois (born September 28, 1944) is a French sprint canoer who competed in the late 1960s and late 1970s. Competing in two Summer Olympics, he earned his best finish of sixth in the K-2 1000 m event at Munich in 1972.

References

Sports-reference.com profile

1944 births
Canoeists at the 1968 Summer Olympics
Canoeists at the 1972 Summer Olympics
French male canoeists
Living people
Olympic canoeists of France